Taukolo Tonga is a Tongan rugby league footballer who represented Tonga at the 1995 World Cup.

References

Living people
Tongan rugby league players
Tonga national rugby league team players
Year of birth missing (living people)